Jagga Tay Shera is a 1984 Pakistani Punjabi language  films.

Directed by Imtiaz Qureshi and produced by Ashiq Hussain. Film starring actor Sultan Rahi, Anjuman, Iqbal Hassan and Ilyas Kashmiri.

Cast
 Sultan Rahi - as Jagga
 Anjuman - (Love interest of Jagga)
  Iqbal Hassan - (Deputy) Sher Dil
 Naghma - Jagga's sister
  Jaggi Malik
  Nasrullah Butt
  Altaf Khan - Jageerdar's son
  Sawan - (Dara Daku)
 Ilyas Kashmiri - Jageerdar
 Changezi
  Anita
 Iqbal Durrani - Jageerdar's son
  Saleem Hasan - Jageerdar's son
  Khawar Abbas
  Hadiar Abbas
  Majeed Zarif 
  Ladla
  Hairat Angez
  Munir Zarif - (comedy actor)
 Albela - (comedy actor)
  Jani - (comedy actor)

Track listing
The music of the film is by Wajahat Attre. The film song lyrics are penned by Khawaja Pervez and the singers are Noor Jehan and Naheed Akhtar.

References

Pakistani action drama films
1984 films
Punjabi-language Pakistani films
1980s Punjabi-language films